Al-Jāmiʿah Dār al-Maʿārif al-Islāmiyyah, popularly known as Darul Marif, is a prominent Qawmi jamiah situated at Bahaddarhat, Chittagong, Bangladesh. Sultan Zauq Nadvi is the founder director of the Jamiah.

Academics
Jamia Darul Ma'arif offers the students Islamic education from the very initial stage up to the highest level. Besides Islamic knowledge it also teaches the student modern knowledge in subjects like English and Bengali languages, mathematics, geography, history, social science and general science up to secondary level.

It also offers specialization (equivalent to PhD) in Islamic studies to students who successfully complete Takmil (MA).

Departments
The Jamiah has the following departments:
 Department of Hifzul Qur'an
 Department of Adab (Arabic Literature)
 Department of Islamic law
 Department of dawa and Islamic studies
 Arabic language course

Publications
Jamia Darul Ma'arif Al-Islamia publishes several publications as below:
Monthly Al Haq (Monthly magazine in Bengali)
Manarus Sharq (periodically Arabic magazine)

References

External links 
 Darul Ulooms, Jamiyas and Qaumi Madrasahs Worldwide

Qawmi madrasas of Bangladesh
Deobandi Islamic universities and colleges